Sanam (lit: Beloved) is a 2016 Pakistani television series that premiered on Hum TV on 12 September 2016. It is written by Mona Haseeb and directed by Haseeb Hassan and produced by Momina Duraid. The story of serial is told in a heavily serialized manner and it follows a love triangle. It revolves around the journey of Harib, a successful businessman, as he discovers the difference between a life partner and a soulmate. The show first aired on Hum TV, as a part of night programming under Duraid's production company.

Sanam has an ensemble cast with Osman Khalid Butt as Harib, Maya Ali as Aan, and Hareem Farooq as Ayla in leading roles, with the supporting cast Hina Khawaja Bayat, Gul-e-Rana, Abid Ali, Asad Ali, Shermeen Ali and Akbar Islam. The show is set in Karachi, Sindh.

Series received generally positive reviews in its premier, however throughout its broadcast it received mixed to negative reviews where viewers and critics declared it as a drag.

Premise

Sanam is a story of love, friendship, jealousy and relationships. It depicts Harib's (Osman Khalid Butt) journey where he found out the difference between a life partner and a soulmate after he went through relationships with Sara (Shermeen Ali), Ayla (Hareem Farooq) and Aan (Maya Ali). Simultaneously it highlights Ayla's bipolar disorder which is later discovered by Harib.

Harib lost his parents at a very young age and struggled to become a rich businessman. He marries his colleague and girlfriend Ayla (Hareem Farooq) and later reveals to her his former relationship with Sara (Shermeen Ali) who had left him long ago due to his low financial status. Simultaneously, Aan (Maya Ali) is a hardworking independent woman who moves next to Harib's house with her mother Shabnam (Hina Khawaja Bayat) after her father's death. In Shabnam's in-laws, Shama Qureshi (Gul-e-Rana) her sister-in-law wants Aan to marry her son Khurram. From the day of her wedding, Ayla reacts to things in a way that gradually reveals to Harib her bipolar disorder from which she has been suffering after her mother's second marriage. She assumes Aan as Sara and that Harib and Aan are in a relationship. She finally takes a divorce from Harib and moves to her parents' home.

After his divorce, a broken Harib is consoled by Aan and her mother who treats him as her son. With time, Aan and Harib become best friends. Sara (Harib's ex-girlfriend) moves in Harib's housing society. After meeting him, she realizes that Harib is now a successful person. She tells him about her separation with her husband Faisal. Aan bonds with Sara's stubborn daughter Fatima (Mariyam Khalif). Sara begins to develop feelings for Harib again, looking to Harib and Aan's strong bonding, Sara's jealousy increases and she decides to separate them. She brings a proposal of her cousin Farhan (Asad Siddiqui) for Aan, which Shabnam accepts. Aan and Farhan get engaged which makes Harib devastated and he confesses his feelings to Aan.

Ayla (who has also moved in the same housing society) snaps a picture of Aan and Harib together and gets it photoshopped into an obscene photograph that gets circulated around social media. As a result, Aan loses her job at the bank. She confronts Harib who files a lawsuit against the bank. However, when Shabnam finds out about Aan's job, she suffers from a heart attack. While she's hospitalized, Farhan and his mother see Harib consoling Aan and tell her off about it. Harib and Shehroze overhear Farhan talking about his past of him being a divorcee and father of two kids. His mother is interested in Aan only because she thinks Aan is a rich heiress. Harib and Shehroze realize that this was Sara's doing. After seeing firsthand the stark difference between Farhan and Harib in the way they help her out in her tough time, Aan also begins to develop feelings for Harib. Eventually both Aan and Harib confess that they love each other but because of Shabnam's frail health, they remain quiet. Farhan finds out the truth about Aan's humble background and her feelings for Harib and secretly escapes to Dubai with his mother. After facing public humiliation of Farhan's reality, Shabnam suffers from a heart attack again and dies. At her funeral, Aan loses her consciousness and her phuppo (Shama) takes her away. Aan's Taya takes charge and tells everyone Aan will only marry whoever she wants. Ayla is institutionalized for rehabilitation. Harib apologizes to her for not doing enough to save their marriage and not realizing that she needed proper treatment. He visits her weekly and monitors her progress. After 6 months Aan returns to her own house, Harib and Aan get married and she gets her job back at the bank. After some time, Aan also joins Harib in his weekly visits to Ayla.

Cast
 Osman Khalid Butt as Harib (Aan's husband, Ayla's former husband)
 Maya Ali as Aan (Harib's wife)
 Hareem Farooq as Ayla (Harib's former wife)
 Emmad Irfani As Shehroze
 Shermeen Ali as Sara
 Mariyam Khalif as Fatima (Sara's daughter)
 Kanwar Nafees as Faisal (Sara's husband)
 Hina Khawaja Bayat as Shabnam (Aan's mother)
 Abid Ali as Shaukat Ali Qureshi (Aan's father)
 Asad Siddiqui as Farhan
 Sabahat Ali Bukhari as Farhan's mother
 Munawwar Saeed as Sharafat Qureshi (Aan's Taya)
 Gul-e-Rana as Shama Qureshi (Aan's Phuppo)
 Akbar Islam as Mehboob (Shama's husband)
 Muhammad Asad as Khurram (Aan's cousin)
 Lubna Aslam as Ayesha (Ayla's mother)
 Sajeer-ud-din Khalifa as Salman (Ayla's father)

Production

Development

Sanam was developed by Hum TV's senior producer Momina Duraid of MD Productions, with director Haseeb Hassan, who was the director of channel's hit series Mann Mayal and Diyar-e-Dil. Haseeb returns to direct fourth year in a row since his first project for channel in 2013. Screenplay was done by director's wife Mona Haseeb while script composing is done by Muhammad Wasi-ul-Din who previously scripted Diyar-e-Dil. The show approximately airs weekly episode for 35–40 minutes (minus commercials) every Monday.

Casting

Creative head Momina Duraid and director Haseeb Hassan mutually choose the cast, which includes Osman Khalid Butt, Maya Ali and Hareem Farooq to play the leading roles of Harib, Aan and Ayla respectively. Osman Khalid Butt and Maya Ali marked their fourth appearance together as a couple having previously acted in Aik Nayee Cinderella, Aunn Zara and Diyar-e-Dil, all of which were commercially and critically successful. Hareem Farooq marked her second appearance with Maya Ali after Diyar-e-Dil. Sanam was Farooq's third collaboration project with Osman Khalid Butt after Diyar-e-Dil where the two shared leading roles and Film Janaan where she holds producer credits. Speaking about her character Farooq said, "My character addresses a very serious mental illness which many people fail to diagnose. In fact, it's a global issue in which one who is suffering and the people around them are unable to figure out what is wrong with them."

Sanam is Mayal Ali's third consecutive collaboration with the director having previously worked in Diyar-e-Dil and Mann Mayal, speaking about her third collaboration, director Haseeb Hassan states It wasn't a deliberate decision; we didn't sign all three of the projects together. I'd honestly call it a coincidence. When we got done with Diyar-e-Dil, we started casting for Sanam, and Maya suited the kind of character the script demanded. During Mann Mayal's casting, we approached several actresses but Maya managed to perfectly fit into Mannu's shoes. Besides that, I'll have to agree with the fact that when you work with people who are genuinely hard working, you try to work with them over and over again.

Emaad Irfani was finalised to portray the role of Shehroze, according to Director's interview with HIP, the creatives first choice was Sheheryar Munawar Sidiqui for this role, since Sidiqui was busy filming his film Project Ghazi, this role was then offered to Irfani who has had three projects airing on Hum TV. Actress Sharmeen Ali was also selected to film in Duraid's two projects Dil Banjaara and Sang-e-Mar Mar was selected to portray the role of Sara.  Veteran actresses Hina Khawaja Bayat and Gul-e-Rana were also a part of secondary cast. Bayat's role was finalised after her collaborations with Haissam Hussain in Aik Nayee Cinderella and Aunn Zara, she is selected to portray Shabnam Shaukat, Aan's mother. Actress Lubna Aslam portrayed the role of Ayla's parents whereas veteran actor Munawar Saeed Shabnam's in-law.

Filming and Locations
Principal photography began in May 2015 after the completion of Diyar-e-Dil. In late June 2015, the project was delayed since creative head Momina Duraid announced the filming of Mann Mayal first, where director Haseeb Hassan chose Maya Ali in leading cast.  Furthermore, in January 2016, the project was delayed once again since Osman Khalid Butt and Hareem Farooq were promoting their film Janan. Speaking about Sanam's delay, Haseeb Hassan says: We wanted to give some gap between Diyar-e-Dil and Sanam because it also stars Osman Khalid Butt and Maya Ali in lead roles. So releasing another serial with the same couple and team immediately after the first one wouldn't have created the buzz. But now people are dying to see them both together, so it'll start airing in a couple of months, it's a unique love story, with a totally different package. Filming resumed in August 2016. The series was released before completion. Filming was extensively done in Naya Nazimabad Karachi with Zeb Rao being the cinematographer, Ishtiaq Hussain and Waqar Baloch being the location coordinator, Akbar Baloch being the head of set department and Kashif Ahmed being the head of post production. Graphics were done by Husnain Daswali and Muhammad Furqa Ali Qazi, while editing was done by Jameel Awan, Mahmood Ali and Mohsin.

Episodes

Music

The title song of Sanam was composed by musician Shuja Haider who also did background music with Bilal Allah Ditta and wrote the lyrics. The lines of the song are frequently used during the course of the show. The original soundtrack was released on 28 September 2016. The song along with production is produced by Momina Duraid under her production company M.D Productions.

The first half of the soundtrack was released on 10 September 2016 and was reduced to 1:10. The next half was released in October 2016. The soundtrack was produced along with series production by Momina Duraid under Duraid's production company M.D Productions. The OST of Sanam received critical acclaim and became the second best television OST for 2017 Television season.

Track listing

Release

Broadcast
Sanam airs a weekly episode on every Monday succeeding Mann Mayal, with time slot of 8:00 pm. The show approximately airs weekly episode for 35–40 minutes (without commercials). The series was ordered 24 episodes. It was aired on Hum Europe in UK, on Hum TV USA in USA and Hum TV Mena on UAE, with same timings and premiered date. All International broadcasting aired the series in accordance with their standard times.

Home media and digital release
The show was also uploaded on YouTube alongside its airing on television but in 2017 the channel deleted all its episodes. It was also released on the iflix app as a part of channel's contract with the app but later on, on terminating the contract in 2019, all the episodes were pulled off and thus had no digital availability to stream. Moreover, it was also released on the Eros Now app. In October 2019, the channel reuploaded all its episodes with muted music.

Reception

Television ratings

Hum TV released Sanam's Television Ratings on their Facebook. Sanam opened with 10.01 million viewers on average and 3.42 TRP (Television Rating Points) for its premier. In October 2016, Sanam's rating increased to 5.62. From episode eight, the series saw another increase, reaching 5.4 TRPs. After a downfall to 3 TRPs, Sanam jumped to 5+ TRPs once again in December. In January 2017, Sanam's 19th Episode received 4.9 TRPs and 20th Episode received 4.32 TRPs but was unable to lead the time slot. With its ending episodes, Sanam received most negative reviews from the critics, the only reason to maintain TV Ratings was its leading cast.

Critical appreciation

Before its premiere, Sanam was listed as the most anticipated series of 2017, Maryam of ReviewIt.PK writes I think it's fair to say that “Sanam” is the most anticipated drama serial of this year. Boasting a star cast that includes Maya Ali, Osman Khalid Butt, Hareem Farooq, Emad Irfani and Hina Bayat, the drama is directed by Haseeb Hassan and penned by his other half, Mona Haseeb. It is a Momina Duraid production so it will air on HUM TV in September.

Aisha of ReviewIt.PK praised Sanam's teaser promos, shooting locations and starrer cast. Series's most discussed and trending topic was one of the protagonists bipolar disorder which was highlighted but was presented with a slow start.

Sadaf Siddiqui of Dawn speaks about Sanam's plot stating that despite having a slow start Sanam highlights one of the main issues of the society, she says Mental illness, particularly bipolar disorder, needs to be dealt with sensitivity. Both patients and their families are affected. More often than not the patient feels helpless and needs support and good medical care to manage their illness. This should be Ayla’s story as well.

In her same editorial Siddiqui added that The Osmaya chemistry previously seen in Diyar-e-Dil had completely lacked in the introduction episodes.

Zahra Mirza of ReviewIt.PK praised the role of Hina Khawaja Bayat as Mrs Shaukat by saying  I actually found the mother’s character quite interesting but I was a little disappointed to see Sir Abid Ali being shown as a spirit which was a result of Aan’s mothers’ hallucination or delusion. From our beloved & favorite Agha Jaan to Shaukat Qureshi, that too in such a setting. The first episode of Sanam received mixed to positive reviews where critics termed it as An average start.

Sanam's last episode received rave reviews for its portrayal of a happy marriage that broke stereotypes. Marie Shaheen wrote These weren't just romantic scenes that someone just blended in.. but the idea behind each and every scene is so heartwarming and breaking the stereotypes truly. Each and every scene had beauty! The peace n happiness of Harib in every single frame and Aan's not just being a wife but a woman having her own identity...It was seriously so heartwarming to watch a sane dimension of husband wife in abundance of shows that portray forced and abusive husband wife relation.

The Blue Jay wrote To tell you all the truth, I'm a sucker for cute, romantic moments, and this episode was FULL OF THEM. Amazing acting by @aclockworkobi and @mayaaliofficial as always. The ending of this drama was just so satisfying. .

MZ wrote at SadafSays.com Always love watching Maya and Hareem onscreen and their chemistry is adorable to say the least. Aan realizes the need to clear out all the blues between her and Ayla so that Ayla can move ahead without any fear or guilt. The time Aan took before confronting Ayla is a subtle detail, perfectly weaved in the narrative. Surely a great sight to see one woman supporting another without any secret grudge or false aims.

See also

 2017 in Pakistani television 
 List of programs broadcast by Hum TV
 Diyar-e-Dil
 Mann Mayal

References

External links
 
 Sanam at Hum TV 
 
 

Hum TV original programming
Pakistani telenovelas
Pakistani romantic drama television series
Serial drama television series
Television series by MD Productions
Television series created by Momina Duraid
Urdu-language television shows
Television series directed by Haseeb Hassan
2016 Pakistani television series debuts
Pakistani drama television series
2017 Pakistani television series endings